Shah Taslim-e Olya (also Romanized as Shāh Taslīm-e ‘Olyā; also known as Shāh Taslīm and Shāh Taslīm-e Bālā) is a village in Mishan Rural District, Mahvarmilani District, Mamasani County, Fars Province, Iran. At the 2006 census, its population was 52, in 11 families.

References 

Populated places in Mamasani County